Sammy Davis Jr. Salutes the Stars of the London Palladium is an album by Sammy Davis Jr., recorded in 1964 as a tribute to artists who have performed at the London Palladium. Davis had just performed a five-week stint at the Palladium, and the album was recorded in London.

Track listing
 "Introduction by Sammy Davis Jr." – 0:56
"My Kind of Girl" (Leslie Bricusse) – 4:07
"Sophisticated Lady" (Duke Ellington, Irving Mills, Mitchell Parish) – 3:57
"Ballin' the Jack" (James Henry Burris, Chris Smith) – 2:15
"Over the Rainbow" (Harold Arlen, Yip Harburg) – 4:10
"(Here I Am) Brokenhearted" (Lew Brown, Ray Henderson) – 3:46
"Jalousie" (Vera Bloom, Jacob Gade) – 4:09
"Smile" (Charlie Chaplin, John Turner, Geoffrey Parsons) – 2:40
"This Was My Love" (Jim Harbert) – 4:24
"(Up a) Lazy River" (Sidney Arodin, Hoagy Carmichael) – 2:55
"Give Me the Moonlight" (Lew Brown, Albert Von Tilzer) – 2:19
"Tenement Symphony" (Hal Borne, Sid Kuller, Ray Golden) – 5:16

Personnel 
Sammy Davis Jr. – vocals
Peter Knight – arrangement, conductor

References

1964 albums
Sammy Davis Jr. albums
Reprise Records albums
Albums conducted by Peter Knight (composer)
Albums arranged by Peter Knight (composer)